Andres Küng (September 13, 1945 – December 10, 2002) was a Swedish journalist, writer, entrepreneur and politician of Estonian origin. He was born in Ockelbo in Gävleborg County to a family of refugees from Soviet occupied Estonia.

Career

Literature
As he himself noted, Küng "published more than 50 books, most on the Baltic States, thousands of articles and held innumerable lectures on why Estonia, Latvia and Lithuania should (and would) become independent again."

Politics
Küng was active in both Swedish politics (member of the People's Party – Liberals) and Estonian and Baltic émigré activities. He was the chairman of the Liberal Students Club of Stockholm between 1966 and 67. Later, he served as the Deputy Board member of the People's Party Youth League. During 1970–71, he was the acting Deputy member 1982 of Riksdag. Küng also participated in the Estonian Liberal Party in exile and several other organisations and campaigns for Baltic struggle for independence. He was a member of the party board for the Swedish Liberal Party from 1982 until 1991.

Noted awards
In November 1998, Andres Küng was awarded the Latvian Order of the Three Stars by the Latvian President Guntis Ulmanis. In February 1999, he was awarded the Estonian Order of the White Star by the Estonian President Lennart Meri.

Bibliography
 Vad händer i Baltikum?, Aldus/Bonniers, 1973  
Bruce Olson: Missionary or colonizer?, 1981 
Sådan är socialismen, Timbro, 1982
Vindens barn: Om medlöperi förr och nu, Timbro, 1983 
A dream of freedom: Four decades of national survival versus Russian imperialism in Estonia, Latvia, and Lithuania, 1940–1980 
Sverige och Estland: äntligen goda grannar?, 1991 
Kommunismen och Baltikum, 1999 ("Communism and the Baltic States", see online https://web.archive.org/web/20060504183740/http://www.rel.ee/swe/kommunism_och_baltikum.htm)
Communism and Crimes against Humanity in the Baltic states, c 1999, refer https://web.archive.org/web/20140616162322/http://www.hot.ee/evlliit/okup_2.htm
Ett liv för Baltikum : journalistiska memoarer. – Stockholm : Timbro, 2002. – 351 s. : ill. –  (Estonian edition: Baltikumile elatud aastad : ajakirjaniku mälestused. – Tallinn, Olion, 2002.)
For the complete list, see .

References

External links
In Memory of Andres Küng's website

1945 births
2002 deaths
People from Ockelbo Municipality
People from Gästrikland
Swedish people of Estonian descent
20th-century Swedish journalists
Swedish male writers
20th-century Swedish businesspeople
Liberals (Sweden) politicians
Recipients of the Order of the White Star, 3rd Class